With the 1888 season, the Brooklyn Grays underwent a name change to the Brooklyn Bridegrooms, a nickname that resulted from several team members getting married around the same time. Also, owner Charles Byrne decided to withdraw from managing the team's on field activities and turned the reins over to more experienced baseball manager Bill McGunnigle. That, along with the Bridegrooms' purchase of several top players from the defunct New York Metropolitans, led to a dramatic on field improvement as the team finished in second place in the American Association.

Offseason
 October 20, 1887: Jim Donahue was purchased by the Bridegrooms from the New York Metropolitans for $25,000.
 October 20, 1887: Bill Fagan, Frank Hankinson, Bill Holbert, Al Mays, Darby O'Brien and Paul Radford were purchased by the Bridegrooms from the New York Metropolitans.
 November 21, 1887: Doc Bushong was purchased by the Bridegrooms from the St. Louis Browns.
 November 26, 1887: Bob Caruthers was purchased by the Bridegrooms from the St. Louis Browns.
 November 29, 1887: Dave Foutz was purchased by the Bridegrooms from the St. Louis Browns.
 January 15, 1888, Jim Donahue, Bill Fagan, Frank Hankinson, Bill Phillips, Henry Porter and Steve Toole were purchased from the Bridegrooms by the Kansas City Cowboys.
 February, 1888: Bert Cunningham and John Harkins were purchased from the Bridegrooms by the Baltimore Orioles.
 February 15, 1888: Jim McTamany was purchased from the Bridegrooms by the Kansas City Cowboys.

Regular season

Season standings

Record vs. opponents

Notable transactions
 August 10, 1888: Oyster Burns was purchased by the Bridegrooms from the Baltimore Orioles.
 September 15, 1888: Bill McClellan was purchased from the Bridegrooms by the Cleveland Blues.
 September 23, 1888: Pop Corkhill was purchased by the Bridegrooms from the Cincinnati Red Stockings.
 September 30, 1888: Hub Collins was purchased by the Bridegrooms from the Louisville Colonels.

Roster

Player stats

Batting

Starters by position
Note: Pos = Position; G = Games played; AB = At bats; R = Runs scored; H = Hits; Avg. = Batting average; HR = Home runs; RBI = Runs batted in; SB = Stolen bases

Other batters
Note: G = Games played; AB = At bats; R = Runs scored; H = Hits; Avg. = Batting average; HR = Home runs; RBI = Runs batted in; SB = Stolen bases

Pitching

Starting pitchers
Note: G = Games pitched; GS = Games started; IP = Innings pitched; W = Wins; L = Losses; ERA = Earned run average; BB = Bases on balls; SO = Strikeouts; CG = Complete games

Notes

References
Baseball-Reference season page
Baseball Almanac season page

External links 
Brooklyn Dodgers reference site
Dodgers Media Guide History
Acme Dodgers page 
Retrosheet

Los Angeles Dodgers seasons
Brooklyn Bridegrooms season
Brooklyn
19th century in Brooklyn
Park Slope